Swadhin Kumar Sarkar is an Indian politician and a Member of Bhartiya  Janta Party. He was MLA from Baishnabnagar-54 constituency from the period of 2016 to 2021. He lost the election in 2021 WBLA elections.

Early life
Sarkar was born to Dwijinder Nath Sarkar. He hails from the village Sarkartola in Malda district of West Bengal. He graduated with a Bachelor of Science degree in biology from Bangabasi College in 1981.

Political career
In the 2016 West Bengal Legislative Assembly election, Sarkar defeated his nearest rival Azizul Haque of Indian National Congress by 4,497, thus becoming one of three MLA of Bharatiya Janata Party to be elected in West Bengal Legislative Assembly.

References

1950s births
Living people
People from Malda district
Bharatiya Janata Party politicians from West Bengal
West Bengal MLAs 2016–2021